The production discography of producer Dr. Luke is as follows:

Written and co-written songs

Produced and co-produced songs
 indicates a song labelled as additional producer.

 indicates a song labelled as co-producer.

Production discographies
Song recordings produced by Dr. Luke
Discographies of American artists